Aguemoune is a village in the Boukhelifa commune in Béjaïa Province, in the Kabylie region of Algeria. It is the hometown of footballer Zinedine Zidane's parents.

References

External links

Populated places in Béjaïa Province